Pasiphila lunata is a species of moth in the family Geometridae. It is found in New Zealand.

The larvae feed on Hebe species.

References

Moths described in 1912
lunata
Moths of New Zealand